The J/APG-1 is an active electronically scanned array (AESA) radar system designed and manufactured by Mitsubishi Electric for use on the Mitsubishi F-2 fighter aircraft starting in 2002. It was the first series production AESA to be introduced on a military aircraft in service. It is currently being upgraded to the J/APG-2 standard for compatibility with the new AAM-4B air-to-air missile.

See also
 Phased array
 Active electronically scanned array

References

Aircraft radars
Military radars of Japan
Military equipment introduced in the 2000s